Thomas Gregory may refer to:

Thomas Gregory
Thomas Watt Gregory (1861–1933), American attorney and United States Attorney General
Thomas Gregory (MP), in 1581 MP for Plympton Erle
Thomas Montgomery Gregory (1887–1971), dramatist, educator, social philosopher and activist

Tom Gregory
Tom Gregory (radio and TV announcer) (1927–2006), American radio and television announcer and news anchor
Tom Gregory (producer) (born 1960), American entertainer and commentator
Tom Gregory (singer) (born 1995), English singer songwriter
Tom Gregory (swimmer) (born 1976), British swimmer and writer